Lindsay Davenport was the two-time defending champion, but chose not to participate that year.

Nadia Petrova won the title, defeating Tatiana Golovin in straight sets in the finals match.

Seeds

Draw

Finals

Top half

Bottom half

References

2006 Porsche Tennis Grand Prix Singles
Porsche Tennis Grand Prix Singles
2006 in German tennis